Fenwick High School is a selective private Catholic college preparatory school located in Oak Park, a town in Cook County, Illinois that is bordered by Chicago on the north, east, River Forest and Forest Park on the West, and Cicero and Berwyn on the south. Fenwick was founded in 1929 and is a ministry of the Province of St. Albert the Great (Dominican Friars). It is the only school directly operated and staffed by the Order of Preachers (Dominican friars) in the United States. It is named in honor of Cincinnati Bishop Edward Dominic Fenwick, O.P..  Fr. Richard Peddicord, O.P. has served as president of Fenwick High School since July 1, 2012.

History
  Fenwick High School was founded as an all-boys college preparatory high school in 1929 by the Catholic Order of Dominican Fathers and Brothers of the Province of St. Joseph. Since its founding, Fenwick has maintained a strict dress code which includes slacks, dress shirts and ties for the boys and plaid skirts and knee-high socks for the girls. During assemblies, blazers must be worn. Fenwick was originally intended to be a prep school for matriculation to the University of Notre Dame in the Midwest and Georgetown University on the East Coast, similar to Phillips Academy Andover's matriculation to Yale, Portsmouth Abbey School's matriculation to Fordham University and Boston College and Phillips Exeter Academy's matriculation to Harvard. Today, Fenwick's students matriculate to many top American and international universities. In 1939, the St. Joseph Province was divided and Fenwick High School became part of the new Province of St. Albert the Great, with headquarters in Chicago. Fenwick became coeducational in 1992, rather than raise tuition costs or see enrollment decline. Today, Fenwick is known as a secondary school. Students have access to many athletic facilities, including a baseball field, two football fields, a softball diamond, a pool, and a soccer field on the campus of Fenwick's Dominican Priory in the nearby suburb of River Forest.

Since its founding, Fenwick has maintained a 100% college matriculation rate.

In 1983 Fenwick was selected by the U.S. Department of Education as a Blue Ribbon School. On January 18, 1999, U.S. News & World Report classified Fenwick as an "Outstanding American High School", making Fenwick tied for the #1 ranked preparatory school in the Chicago area. For 2009, Fenwick's 290 student class had 211 of them receive 718 academic scholarships to top universities around the country with the monetary value of these awards in excess of $16,000,000 (up from $13,900,000 in 2008–2007, $12,555,800 in 2007-2006 and 9,370,000 in 2006– 2005). The 2009 graduating class also boasted 187 Presidential Scholars and 30 National Merit Finalists, with 22 additional receiving commendation for being named to the top 5% in the nation. Fenwick's 2010–2011 class achieved $40,000,000 in merit based scholarships.

Around the time Fenwick started admitting girls, there was a proposal to officially move classes to the school's priory in River Forest, or construct a brand new school in collaboration with nearby Trinity High School, its all-girls counterpart run by the Dominican Sisters. The idea almost passed, but was dropped when Fenwick insisted on maintaining complete control over the standards of the new school. Instead, Fenwick has commenced several expansion campaigns at their present location in Oak Park based around their original Neo-gothic designed school created by the New York architect Wilfred E. Anthony, who also redesigned the Basilica of the Sacred Heart, Indiana for the University of Notre Dame in South Bend, Indiana. The latest expansions include: a new field house with a 1,100-seat gymnasium and a 450-seat natatorium; several new classrooms and updated athletic lockers; a new school entrance and gateway inspired by the Arch at Northwestern University; and additional science laboratories and art studios, all of which are in keeping with the original Neo-gothic look of Fenwick's school and priory.

Fenwick is the only high school in the United States owned and operated by the Dominican Order. Fenwick's school mottoes are the same as those of the Dominican Order: Laudare, Benedicere, Praedicare (praise, bless, preach); Veritas (truth); Contemplare et Contemplata Aliis Tradere (to study and hand on the fruits of study). Fenwick often uses the Blackfriar as a mascot over a generic friar mascot since the Blackfriar is specifically associated with the Dominican Order.

Academics

The first sentence of the school's philosophy statement, defines the school as a "college preparatory high school". Students are required to study four years of theology, English, mathematics, and a foreign language in order to graduate.

As a part of the third-year theology course, students are required to plan and conduct a "Christian Service Project". The project requires a minimum of thirty hours of service, no more than 20 of which may be completed prior to the start of the student's junior year.

The school offers 20 courses as a part of the Advanced Placement program: English Language, English Literature, Art History, French Language, Spanish Language, AP Latin, Statistics, Computer Science A, Biology, Chemistry, Physics (C), Physics 1, Physics 2, Environmental Science, Psychology, U.S. History, European History, Economics, World History, and U.S. Government.

The school offers AP Calculus BC, and gives students the option to take either the "AB" or "BC" test at the end of the year. Beyond AP Calculus, the school offers courses in multivariable calculus, linear algebra and differential equations.

Extracurricular achievements

Athletics

The Fenwick Friars compete in two conferences. Male teams compete in the Chicago Catholic League (CCL), while the female teams compete in the East Suburban Catholic Conference. The school competes in state championship series sponsored by the Illinois High School Association (IHSA).

The Girls’ hockey team won the State Championship in 2019 at the United Center.

The boys' varsity hockey team has played in the state championship game, held at the United Center, in five consecutive seasons (2002–2006), winning the state title (the Blackhawk Cup) in the 2002–03 and 2003–04 seasons. The 2003–2004 team compiled a record of 62–9–2 and is considered one of Illinois' most accomplished high school hockey teams to have ever played in the Midwest. The hockey team has won five straight Kennedy Cups, three of them over their hockey archrival Loyola Academy.

The boys lacrosse team took the state championship in just its second year as a varsity program.

Fenwick has been a dominant force in water polo. Since the IHSA first started sponsoring a water polo state tournament in 2002, Fenwick's men's and women's teams have won a combined eleven of the first fourteen state championships.

Prior to the institution of a state playoff system for football in the 1970s, Fenwick competed to play in the Prep Bowl, which pitted the champions of the CCL against the champion of the Chicago Public League. Fenwick won two Prep Bowl titles at the game's usual home of Soldier Field. The first was in 1945, when a crowd of 80,000 fans saw Fenwick defeat Tilden High School, 20–6. The second was in 1962, and saw Fenwick defeat Schurz High School, 40–0. The win not only capped an undefeated season, but was played before over 91,000 fans; the third-largest crowd to witness a high school football game in Illinois history. The 1945 game is tied for seventh in terms of crowd size.

In 2021, Fenwick won its first-ever IHSA Football State Championship, winning the 5A division after beating Kankakee High School in the finals, while going 12-2 overall on the season. 

By 2007, Fenwick had over 77 all-conference championships. The boy's JV hockey team and the girls pom pom team have also earned state championships. Sports Illustrated has added Fenwick to its list of the "50 Best High School Athletic Programs in the Country", recognizing Fenwick as having the best athletic program in Illinois. Fenwick's 2006–2007 swimming and swim/polo teams produced 12 NISCA Academic All-American athletes. For 2009, two state championships were achieved in water polo, 11 regional, sectional or supersectional championships were earned, along with 15 conference titles. There were also 17 All-State athletes, 19 All-American athletes and 12 All-Academic athletes named. Five students were granted NCAA athletic scholarships.

State championships
The following teams have finished in the top four of their respective state tournament sponsored by the IHSA:
football 2021-2022
basketball (girls) 2000–01, 2006–07
swimming & diving (boys) 1989–90, 1990–91, 1991–92
water polo (boys) 2001–02, 2003–04, 2004–05, 2005–06, 2006–07, 2007–08, 2008–09, 2009–10, 2010–11, 2012–13
water polo (girls) 2003–04, 2004–05, 2005–06, 2007–08, 2008–09, 2010–11, 2011–12, 2013–14, 201516

Non-athletic activities
Fenwick's academic teams are also highly competitive. The Math Team was state champion in 2002, in large part to the great teaching of Roger Finnell, a teacher there for 50 years now, and has also been the highest scoring private school in the AA Division for 14 years in a row. 2009 marks the 16th consecutive year for Fenwick's Math Team to qualify for state.

Fenwick's Scholastic Bowl Team has been league champions for the last 4 years, and has twice finished in the top four at the Illinois High School Association State Championship Tournament (2001 & 2004).

Fenwick is the 2011 Chicago Conference Chess Champions.

Fenwick's Worldwide Youth in Science and Engineering (WYSE) and Junior Engineering Technical Society (JETS) teams are also highly accomplished; Fenwick's WYSE/JETS teams were national champions in 1989 are 13-time Illinois state champions. 2011 marks the 8th consecutive year to be so. The 2011 JETS team placed first in their conference with the highest possible score of 74/80, earning a "Best in the State" award and a 2nd place national ranking from 1229 teams of 43 states. Fenwick's team was only one point behind the first place nationally ranked team. After a two-year championship drought, Fenwick placed first in the state and fifth in the world in TEAMS, beating teams such as University of Chicago Lab and Marist High School.

The Wick (school newspaper), The Blackfriars Yearbook, and the Touchstone (literary magazine), have all been recognized with awards by the American Scholastic Press Association. The 2006–2007 edition of Touchstone was awarded first place with special honors by the American Scholastic Press Association, placing Fenwick's publication at the top 5% of all high school literary publications in the country. Touchstone has earned 970/1000 possible points by the American Scholastic Press Association, thereby allowing it to be a contender for the "Most Outstanding High School Literary and Art Magazine".

The Fenwick Student Congressional Debate team is also ranked highly. In 2014, Fenwick Student Congress ranked 1st in the Northern Illinois District Sectionals, and had the most semi-finalists in State out of any high school. Student Congress has also been 1st in the Chicago Catholic Forensics League for five years in a row. 2015 will also mark the 10th year that fenwick has brought students to the highly prestigious Harvard, Yale, and Isidore Newman national tournaments.

Notable alumni

Public service and politics
 Daniel Cronin (class of 1977) is a former DuPage County Board chairman and a former Illinois State senator representing Illinois' 21st Legislative District (1993–2010).
 William J. Cullerton (class of 1941), World War II flying ace and radio host. He was taken prisoner by the Gestapo, shot and left to die, but survived, then escaped and returned to the U.S., where he was inducted into the Illinois Military Aviation Hall of Fame. He was the 4th highest ace of World War II with a total of 29 hits, flying a P-51 Mustang called "Miss Steve".
 Jim Durkin (class of 1979) served as a Republican member of the Illinois House of Representatives from 1995 to 2003, and 2006 to 2023.
 Major General Michael D. Healy (class of 1945). U.S. Army from 1945 to 1981. Highly decorated for valor in the Korean War and Vietnam War. Commanded the United States Army John F. Kennedy Center for Military Assistance/Institute for Military Assistance (now Special Warfare Center and School). Served as the inspiration for Colonel Mike in the book and movie The Green Berets.
 Joseph Kerwin (class of 1949) was a NASA astronaut who flew on the Skylab 2 mission, becoming the first American medical doctor in space. He was also a CAPCOM for the Apollo 13 mission.
 Peter Newell (class of 1997) served as the White House scheduler for President Barack Obama.
 Chris Nybo served as a Republican member of the Illinois Senate, and the Illinois House of Representatives.
 Pat Quinn (class of 1967) was Illinois state treasurer (1991–95), Illinois lieutenant governor (2001–2009) and Illinois governor (2009–2015).
 Anne Smedinghoff (class of 2005) was an American diplomat who served in Venezuela and Afghanistan. She died on April 6, 2013, while serving her country in a diplomatic mission in Zabul province, Afghanistan.

Arts, sciences, and letters
 Philip Caputo (class of 1959) is an author (A Rumor of War) and Pulitzer Prize winning reporter for coverage of Chicago election fraud.
 Patrick Creadon (class of 1985) is a documentary filmmaker (Wordplay, I.O.U.S.A.), and has twice been nominated for the Grand Jury Prize at the Sundance Film Festival.
 Aimee Garcia (class of 1996) is an actress (Veronica on the George Lopez TV series).
 Bernard M. Judge (class of 1957) was part of a Pulitzer Prize winning team, Pulitzer Prizer Juror, Chicago Journalism Hall of Fame, and is a journalism professor at the Medill School of Journalism of Northwestern University
Jim Quinlan (class of 1952) was a screenwriter and author.
 R. Emmett Tyrrell (class of 1961) is founder of The American Spectator and best-selling author of Madame Hillary: The Dark Road to the White House and The Clinton Crack-Up.
 Gene Wolande (class of 1974) is a character actor, writer, and director.

Athletics and gaming
 Fred Baer (class of 1951) was selected as the Most Valuable Player on the 1954 Michigan Wolverines football team.
 Bates Battaglia (class of 1993) is an NHL forward (1997–2004, 2005–present). He played for the Carolina Hurricanes during the 2002 Stanley Cup Finals.
 Colby Burnett (class of 2001), Jeopardy! champion
John Giannini is the head coach of La Salle University men's basketball team.
Mike Heathcott is a former MLB player (Chicago White Sox).
Johnny Lattner (class of 1950) was a former professional football player for the Pittsburgh Steelers. He won the 1953 Heisman trophy playing for the University of Notre Dame, and is one of only two two–time winners of the Maxwell Award (1952 & 1953). He was elected to the College Football Hall of Fame in 1979.
Erin Lawless (class of 2003) played international basketball for Slovakia.
Corey Maggette (class of 1998) was an NBA forward (1999–2013), and first–round draft pick in the 1999 NBA Draft. He has spent most of his career with the Los Angeles Clippers. He is currently an analyst with Fox Sports West.
Ben Ponzio (class of 1993) was a 2007 World Series of Poker Bracelet Winner in the $2,000 No Limit Texas Hold' em event.
Mike Rabold (class of 1955) was an NFL offensive lineman (1959–62, 1964–67), mostly with the Chicago Bears.
Dave Schrage (class of 1979) has been a collegiate head baseball coach at Northern Iowa University (1991–99), Northern Illinois University (2000–02), University of Evansville (2003–06), and University of Notre Dame (2006-10).
Ken Sitzberger (class of 1963) was a diver who won the gold medal in the 3-meter springboard at the 1964 Summer Olympics. He was a three time U.S. champion, and was a television color commentator for 16 years. He was inducted into the International Swimming Hall of Fame in 1994.
Robert Spillane (class of 2014) is a professional football player for the Pittsburgh Steelers.
Tim Stapleton (class of 2002) is a former NHL center of the Atlanta Thrashers.
Marques Sullivan (class of 1996) was a professional offensive lineman for the Buffalo Bills, New York Giants, New England Patriots, and Chicago Rush.

Business and industry
 Edward A. Brennan (class of 1951), former CEO of Sears, Roebuck and Co. (1986–95); and later served on the boards of American Airlines, McDonald's, 3M, and Exelon, among others.
 George M. Keller (class of 1941) served as chairman and CEO of Chevron Corporation
 A. G. Lafley (class of 1965) is the President & CEO (2000–present) and chairman of the board (2002–present) of Procter & Gamble
 Michael R. Quinlan (class of 1962) is the former chairman of the board (1990–99) and CEO (1987–98) of The McDonald's Corporation. Since 2000, he has been a Director of Dun & Bradstreet.
 Paul E. Tierney, Jr. (class of 1960) served as the Director of Liz Claiborne Inc., member of the Council on Foreign Relations, and is an adjunct professor at Columbia Business School

Notable staff
Roger Finnell who graduated from Fenwick in 1959 retired from teaching in 2022 after serving as a Fenwick teacher for 59 years.
 John Jardine was the school's football coach (1959–63). He later served as head football coach of the University of Wisconsin (1970–77).
 Pascal Bedrossian is a former French pro soccer player in France and US, was coach of Fenwick varsity girls' soccer team.

References

Additional information

External links
 Fenwick High School

Educational institutions established in 1929
Roman Catholic Archdiocese of Chicago
Catholic secondary schools in Illinois
Oak Park, Illinois
Private high schools in Cook County, Illinois
Dominican schools in the United States
1929 establishments in Illinois